Caftan Show is a fashion event in Morocco for which Moroccan fashion designers attempt to showcase their upcoming line of Moroccan Caftans during a big competition.  The Caftan show debuts every year, particularly the Spring season.  It was created by Femmes du Maroc and aired on 2M TV Morocco.

References

Fashion events in Africa